Oyun is a Local Government Area in Kwara State, Nigeria. Its headquarters are in the town of Ilemona.
 
It has an area of 476 km and a population of 94,253 at the 2006 census.

The postal code of the area is 240.

References

Local Government Areas in Kwara State